Punky is an Irish animated television series created by Lindsay J. Sedgwick and produced by Dublin based Monster Animation and Design. The series features the lead character as having Down syndrome, with the intention of being the first animated series to do so.

Development
The show's creative director is Jason Tammemagi, who has been involved in a number of animated shows for pre-school children, including Fluffy Gardens.

The series is produced with the support of Down Syndrome Ireland, who also reviewed material during development and production of the series. The series is supported by investment incentives from the Government of Ireland (Section 481), in association with RTÉjr, with the participation of the Irish Film Board and the Broadcasting Authority of Ireland’s Sound & Vision Fund. A second series (also 20 x 7 mins) was launched in February 2014.

Characters
Punky relates tales from the everyday life of a six-year-old little girl who has Down syndrome. Punky is characterized as a happy little girl who, as explained in the introduction of the show, loves "music", "dancing" and "hugs". She is shown to like to play with her older brother, "Con", and her dog, "Rufus". She also tries to make her grandmother "Cranky", "just a little less cranky".

The lead character is voiced by Aimée Richardson, a voice actress who has Down syndrome.

Broadcast
It aired in a number of TV networks in the UK, Australia, Germany and Sweden to screen the show. An Irish language version of the show is also in production, to be broadcast on TG4.

References

External links

 
 Down Syndrome Ireland

Irish children's animated television series
2011 Irish television series debuts
Television shows set in the Republic of Ireland
Down syndrome in television
Irish flash animated television series
Irish preschool education television series
Animated preschool education television series
2010s preschool education television series
Animated television series about children